European Security Treaty is proposition made by Russian president Dmitry Medvedev for a new security agreement between Europe, CIS countries, and the United States.

See also
Treaty on Conventional Armed Forces in Europe
European integration

External links
 The draft of the European Security Treaty

Arms control treaties
Proposed treaties
Multilateral relations of Russia
Dmitry Medvedev